Exit is a 2011 science fiction thriller film. The film premiered at the 2011 Fantasia International Film Festival.

Plot
In the film, inhabitants of a city begin to believe they are living in a giant maze. They leave their lives behind to walk the streets opening doors, searching for the door they are convinced has been lost for thousands of years: the exit from the city. Whatever is behind it is the subject of contemplation and conflict in the film. The story focuses on one inhabitant, Alice, and her team that believes she has found it using a strange system of maps, symbols and measurements.

Filming
The film was filmed in a bleached out fashion largely around The Hoddle Grid in Melbourne's Central business district.

Reception
Neil Mitchell of the Eye For Film had given the film 4 out of 5 and compared it to Stalker, Primer, and The Matrix.

References

External links

2011 films
2010s English-language films